Milan is a major city in Italy.

Milan may also refer to:

Film and television 

 Milan (1942 film), an Indian film, with music by S. D. Burman
 Milan (1946 film), an Indian film starring Dilip Kumar, directed by Nitin Bose
 Milan (1958 film), an Indian film; see List of Bollywood films of 1958
 Milan (1967 film), an Indian film
 Milan (1995 film), an Indian film
 Milan (2004 film), a Filipino film
 Milan (2007 film), a German short film, Grand Prix winner at the Tampere Film Festival
 Milan (Indian TV series), an Indian drama television series

Military
 Milan (naval exercise), a biannual multilateral naval exercise hosted by the Indian Navy
 HMS Milan (1805), a 38-gun fifth rate frigate of the Royal Navy 
 French destroyer Milan (1934)
 MILAN, a European anti-tank guided missile
 Milan, a variant of the Mirage V fighter

People
 Milan (given name), a Slavic male name
 Milan (surname), an English surname
 Milan (Kurdish tribe)
 Milan (art director), an Indian film art director

Places

Canada
 Milan, Quebec, a village

Colombia
 Milán, Caquetá, a town and municipality

Iran
 Milan, West Azerbaijan, a village
 Milan-e Baba Ahmadi, a village in Chaharmahal and Bakhtiari Province

Italy
 Duchy of Milan, a historic state in northern Italy
 Metropolitan City of Milan
 Milan (camp), set up to house Jewish refugees after World War II
 Province of Milan, of which the city was the capital

Switzerland
 Parc de Milan, a public park in the city of Lausanne

United States
 Milan, Georgia
 Milan, Illinois
 Milan, Indiana
 Milan, Kansas
 Milan, Michigan
 Milan, Minnesota
 Milan, Missouri
 Milan, New Hampshire
 Milan, New Mexico
 Milan, New Orleans, Louisiana
 Milan, New York
 Milan, Ohio
 Milan, Tennessee
 Milan, Washington
 Milan, Wisconsin
 Milan Township (disambiguation)

Schools
 Milan Conservatory
 Milan High School (Indiana)
 Milan High School (Michigan)

Sports
 1954 Milan High School basketball team, a famous Indiana high school team which served as the real-life inspiration for the 1986 film Hoosiers
 A.C. Milan, an Italian football team
 A.C. Milan Women, an Italian women's football team
 A.C.F. Milan, a disbanded Italian women's football team
 Esporte Clube Milan, a Brazilian football team
 Inter Milan, an Italian football team
 Inter Milan (women), an Italian women's football team
 Milan (horse), a Thoroughbred racehorse
 Milan AC, a name for the HC Devils Milano ice hockey team in the 1993/94 season

Other uses
 Bautek Milan Racer, a German hang glider
 Epyc Milan, the third generation of AMD's Epyc line of server processors, codenamed Milan
 Mercury Milan, an automobile
 Milan, a German velomobile
 "Milan", the code name for the Microsoft PixelSense project's table top computer
 Milan (comics), a Marvel Comics character
 Milan (cultural festival), a cultural fest of SRM University, India
 Milan Entertainment, an internationally operating record company
 Milan Records, a record label
 Milan royal, the French translation for the bird called Milvus milvus 
 SETCA Milan, a French light aircraft
 Studio des Milans, Gojira's recording studio in the Landes, France, named after the bird Milan royal (Milvus milvus)

See also
 Milano (disambiguation)
 Milana (disambiguation)